Pathmanathan is a Tamil male given name. Due to the Tamil tradition of using patronymic surnames it may also be a surname for males and females. It is most prevalent in Sri Lanka.

Notable people

Given name
 K. Pathmanathan (1948–2009), Sri Lankan politician
 S. Pathmanathan (born 1940), Sri Lankan historian and academic

Surname
 Gajan Pathmanathan (1954–2012), Sri Lankan cricketer
 Pathmanathan Ramanathan (1932–2006), Sri Lankan lawyer and judge
 Pathmanathan Sathiyalingam, Sri Lankan physician and politician
 Terry Pathmanathan (born 1956), Singaporean footballer

Alias
 Selvarasa Pathmanathan (born 1955), Sri Lankan militant

See also
 

Tamil masculine given names